No Matter What's the Cause is the seventh full-length studio album by the German thrash metal band Holy Moses.

Track listing

Credits
Andy Classen - Guitars, Vocals
Dan Lilker - Bass
Sven Herwing - Drums

1994 albums
Holy Moses albums
SPV/Steamhammer albums